Parabacteroides bouchesdurhonensis  is a bacterium from the genus of Parabacteroides which has been isolated from human faeces.

References 

Bacteroidia
Bacteria described in 2018